Hifo is a surname. Notable people with the surname include:

Nuko Hifo, Tongan rugby league player
Roman Hifo (born 1986), New Zealand rugby league player